Ruslan Volodymyrovych Malinovskyi (born 4 May 1993) is a Ukrainian professional footballer who plays as a midfielder for  club Marseille, on loan from Serie A club Atalanta, and the Ukraine national team. He is a set piece specialist and possesses a powerful and accurate shot with either foot.

Club career

Early career
Malinovskyi began his career at local side Polissya Zhytomyr under the management of Serhiy Zavalko.

Malinovskyi was a member of the Ukraine national under-19 team. From 1 September 2012, he played on loan for Sevastopol, signing a one-and-a-half-year contract.

Shakhtar Donetsk
From 2011, Malinovskyi was a player of Shakhtar Donetsk, who sent him on loan to different clubs. He played for Shakhtar-3 from 2010 to 2012, playing 39 matches and scoring 10 goals. He made no appearances for Shakhtar's first team.

Loan to Sevastopol
Malinovskyi played for Sevastopol in the 2012–13 season making 16 appearances and scoring one goal. Also, in 2013, he played for the farm club of the team, Sevastopol-2, scoring one goal in four matches. In 2014, due to the Russian occupation of the Crimean peninsula, Sevastopol was disbanded, and a new club was created on its base.

Loan to Zorya Luhansk
In 2014, Malinovskyi went on loan to Zorya Luhansk, where he became a main player in the team. He was recognised as the best young player in Ukraine. Malinovskyi scored goals not only in the Ukrainian Premier League, but also twice in the UEFA Europa League against Belgian side Charleroi.

Loan to Genk
On 1 January 2016, it was officially announced that Malinovskyi would be loaned to Belgian side Genk until the end of the season. He debuted for the club in the Belgian Cup semi-final against Standard Liège and spent 72 minutes on the field. Altogether, during the loan at the Belgian club, Malinovskyi played 41 games in all tournaments, in which he scored 13 goals and made eight assists.

Genk
On 29 May 2017, it was announced that Genk had redeemed Malinovskyi's contract from Shakhtar Donetsk, with the player signing a four-year deal.

Atalanta
On 16 July 2019, Malinovskyi signed for Atalanta for €13.7 million. On 22 October 2019, he scored his first goal for Atalanta in the UEFA Champions League game against Manchester City. Malinovskyi was named Player of the Month by Atalanta supporters. He scored his first Serie A goal on 7 December 2019 in a match against Hellas Verona. On 24 June 2020, Malinovskyi scored the equalizing goal in a 3–2 comeback win against Lazio. On 18 April 2021, he scored the winning goal in a 1–0 win over Juventus; this was Atalanta's first win against Juventus in Serie A since February 2001. On 19 May 2021, he scored in the final of the Coppa Italia against the same opponents but Atalanta fell to a 1–2 defeat. On 24 February 2022, after having scored a goal against Olympiakos, he showed a t-shirt with the text "No War in Ukraine" after Russian invasion of Ukraine.

Loan to Marseille
On 9 January 2023, Malinovskiy joined Ligue 1 side Marseille a loan until the end of the season, with an option for the French club to purchase the player.

Career statistics

Club

International

As of match played 11 June 2022. Ukraine score listed first, score column indicates score after each Malinovskyi goal.

Honours
Sevastopol
Ukrainian First League: 2012–13

Genk
Belgian Pro League: 2018–19

Atalanta
Coppa Italia runner-up: 2020–21

Ukraine U21
Commonwealth of Independent States Cup: 2014

Individual
Ukrainian Premier League Young Player of the Year: 2013–14
Genk Player of the Season: 2018–19
Serie A Player of the Month: May 2021, February 2022
Serie A Goal of the Month: February 2022
Serie A top assist provider: 2020–21
Golden talent of Ukraine: 2014

References

External links
Ruslan Malinovskyi at the Ukrainian Association of Football

1993 births
Living people
Footballers from Zhytomyr
Ukrainian footballers
Association football midfielders
Ukraine international footballers
Ukraine under-21 international footballers
Ukraine youth international footballers
FC Shakhtar-3 Donetsk players
FC Sevastopol-2 players
FC Sevastopol players
FC Zorya Luhansk players
K.R.C. Genk players
Atalanta B.C. players
Olympique de Marseille players
Belgian Pro League players
Ukrainian Premier League players
Ukrainian First League players
Ukrainian Second League players
Serie A players
Ligue 1 players
UEFA Euro 2020 players
Ukrainian expatriate footballers
Expatriate footballers in Belgium
Expatriate footballers in Italy
Expatriate footballers in France
Ukrainian expatriate sportspeople in Belgium
Ukrainian expatriate sportspeople in Italy
Ukrainian expatriate sportspeople in France